Latin American migration to the United Kingdom dates back to the early 19th century. However, before the 1970s, when political and civil unrest became rife in many Latin American countries, the United Kingdom's Latin American community was not particularly large. Economic migration to the United Kingdom has since increased. Brazilian and Colombian-born residents are the two largest groups standing at 95,000 and 36,000 respectively as of 2019. A number of refugees and asylum seekers moved to the UK during the late 20th century, however, since the turn of the millennium, Latin Americans have been migrating to the UK for a wide range of reasons and at present the community consists of people from all walks of life. The UK is also home to British-born people of Latin American ancestry. During the 2008–2014 Spanish financial crisis, Britain also became one of the favourite European destinations for some of the roughly 1.4 million Latin Americans who had acquired Spanish citizenship.

History and settlement

Early presence of political figures

Latin Americans have inhabited what is now the United Kingdom for centuries, albeit in much smaller numbers than there are currently. The earliest migrants date back to the late 18th century/ early 19th century, these were politicians and writers who were living largely in London in hope of raising funds for weapons to help free Latin America from Spanish and Portuguese rule. The reason for London being a prime choice for such individuals to temporarily reside in is that Britain was quite happy to support them and see the Spanish Empire weaken as the British Empire continued to grow across the world. Simón Bolívar who played a key role in the Spanish–American War of independence visited London for six months in 1810 as leader of a diplomatic mission. Bolívar's forerunner Venezuelan-born Francisco de Miranda spent fourteen years of his life as a political exile in the British capital, originally a member of the Spanish Navy he made a decision to help free Latin America after witnessing the American War of Independence. de Miranda was a close ally of British Prime Minister William Pitt, and after several meetings between the two Pitt pledged money from the British government to help Latin America in their war of independence. Within a matter of years many Latin American countries gained independence and many Latin American political figures remained in London in a bid to search for loans to aid the development of their respective new nations. It wasn't only political figures who took advantage of London's welcoming and safe environment, many Latin American writers who would most likely have been executed or imprisoned for their work in their native lands, published their work in the UK, good examples of this being the Brazilian Hippolyto da Costa and the Colombian Juan Garcia del Rio.

Exiles and refugees after 1970
The first significant and large wave of migration from Latin America to the United Kingdom occurred in the 1970s; the Immigration Act 1971 was just one factor that acted as a catalyst for this phenomenon. Prior to 1971, there were strict rules in place that only allowed residents of current or former British overseas territories and colonies to be granted work permits etc. in the mainland UK. This change in legislation made it much easier for Latin Americans and other such groups to gain a right to live and work in the UK. From this point onwards, the Latin American community in the UK began to grow with the arrival of migrant workers and refugees escaping oppressive political regimes. Some 2,500 exiles from Chile were the first large group of Latin American migrants to the UK when they settled in London in the early 1970s; they consisted of businessmen, professors, and students who had fled their home country due to the ongoing political instability. Exiles included right wingers fleeing the rule of Salvador Allende and later leftists fleeing the Pinochet regime. Chile wasn't the only source of Latin American refugees in the 1970s and late 20th century in general, many individuals from the likes of Argentina, Bolivia, Colombia and Ecuador also requested the right for asylum in the UK. Argentina's military government (National Reorganization Process) which remained in power between 1976 and 1983 was another major push factor which contributed to large-scale Latin American refugee migration to the UK. Colombians are the largest Latin American group in the UK and they have been arriving in the thousands since the 1970s; most moved between 1986 and 1997 after they were forced from their homes due to guerrilla and paramilitary violence in Colombia. Through most of the 20th century, Britain was in fact the most favoured European destination for Colombian migrants and refugees, even ahead of Spain. Bolivians are a fairly small Latin American refugee group in the UK; during Bolivia's spell of political instability in the late 20th century many instead chose to make a new life for themselves in the United States or other South American nations. Despite this, the UK still to this day remains the second most popular destination for Bolivian migrants to Europe regardless of status. Cubans, although relatively small in number, have been migrating to the UK since the early 1960s, fleeing the Communist takeover of Cuba. Most migration happened during the Freedom Flights which started in 1965 when some Cubans chose the UK as an alternative to the United States.

Economic and recent migration

Demographics and population
Unlike the United States Census, the United Kingdom Census doesn't include a category for individuals to identify as 'Latin American' and it is therefore fairly difficult to know exactly how many British citizens or residents are of Latin American ethnic or national origin.

Official statistics on Latin American-born residents
According to the 2001 UK Census, 62,735 Latin Americans in the United Kingdom were born in their respective nations of origin. There were also a further 1,338 people who stated their birthplace as 'South or Central America' (note that not all South American countries are "Latin"). In 2009, the Office for National Statistics estimated that the number of Brazilian-born people in the UK alone had risen to around 60,000 and the number of Colombian-born to around 22,000. Estimates for other Latin American countries were not made because the sample size did not allow for estimation of the size of smaller groups with sufficient degree of accuracy.

Other population estimates
A number of other estimates of the population of Latin Americans in the UK are available. A detailed analysis was undertaken in May 2011 which estimated the population to be 186,500 in the UK, of which 113,500 were in London. This figure includes irregular and second generation Latin Americans.

Population distribution
According to a 2005 report by the Institute for Public Policy Research, based on data from the 2001 Census, the ten census tracts with the largest South American-born populations are all in London. Hyde Park had the highest number of South Americans, followed by Vauxhall North, Kensington, Chelsea, Vauxhall South, Regent's Park, Streatham North, Hammersmith, Streatham South, Hackney South, and Newham. Outside of London, the largest South American populations were to be found in Oxford, Cambridge, central Manchester, central Bristol, central Edinburgh and Milton Keynes. More recently, it has been suggested that Liverpool now has the UK's largest Latin American population outside London.

Latin Americans acquiring British citizenship
The table below shows the number of Latin Americans who acquired citizenship of the United Kingdom between 1997 and 2008; sorted alphabetically.

Cultural impact

Festivals 
A number of festivals celebrate Latin American culture in the UK:
 Brazilica Festival (Liverpool)
 Carnaval del Pueblo (London)
 Carnival de Cuba (London)
 El Sueño Existe (Machynlleth)

Newspapers
A newspaper, Noticias Latin America (NLA), was published in London from 1992 until about 2008, but the newspaper ceased publication, and the company was struck off and dissolved in 2010.

Crónica Latina was probably one of the first Latin American newspapers in London, founded in 1984 by Juan Salgado, first published as Notas de Colombia before adopting the name 'Cronica Latinas' in 1986. The newspaper is no longer in circulation.

Social and political issues

Assimilation into British culture
Latin Americans residing in the UK often call themselves the "Invisibles", as a reflection of the lack of representation they have in the communities and the fact that there is no formal ethnic minority status for Latin Americans.

Economics and employment
85% of the Latin American community are employed, many are often in jobs they are over-qualified for, and very few take state benefits. Some 70% of Latin Americans residing in the UK have some form of education beyond the secondary level, however, they are 10 times more likely to work for less than the minimum wage. Often, emigrants who come to the country as lawyers or other skilled professions end up having to work in low level positions due to lack of opportunities. 40% of Latin American workers have claimed to experience workplace abuse and exploitation and 11% report being paid less than the national minimum wage – a proportion 10 times higher than the average rate for the British population.

Asylum seekers and refugees
Many Latin Americans have fled their home countries in search of safety and political asylum in the United Kingdom due to conflicts and civil wars, such as the ongoing Colombian armed conflict that began in 1964.

Notable individuals

See also 
Latin Americans
Latin America–United Kingdom relations
Latin American diaspora
Foreign-born population of the United Kingdom
Migration from Latin America to Europe
Spaniards in the United Kingdom
Portuguese in the United Kingdom
British Latin American

References

External links

London Latin American Film Festival
Visit London - Latin American section
History of Latin Americans in the UK
Reassessing what we collect website – Central and South American London (History of Central and South American London with objects and images)